Athalício Theodoro Pithan (1898–1966) was the first native bishop of the Anglican Episcopal Church of Brazil. He was the author of several religious books in Portuguese.

References

External links
Athalício Theodoro Pithan Biography (Portuguese)

1898 births
1966 deaths
Brazilian Anglican bishops
20th-century Anglican bishops in South America
Portuguese-language writers
People from Santa Maria, Rio Grande do Sul
Episcopal bishops of Southern Brazil